Rosalind Louise Spence (born 16 December 1970) is an Australian politician. She has been a Labor Party member of the Victorian Legislative Assembly since November 2014, representing Yuroke from 2014 to 2022, then Kalkallo from 2022 onwards.

Spence is presently the Minister for Prevention of Family Violence, Community Sport and Suburban Development in the Third Andrews Ministry.

Early life, education and career
Spence was raised in Eltham and graduated from Eltham High School in 1988. She later graduating with a Bachelor of Laws and a Bachelor of Arts from the University of Tasmania in 2002.

Prior to her election to Parliament, Spence worked as an electorate officer to various state and federal Members of Parliament, as operations manager for the Victorian branch of the Australian Labor Party, and as a volunteer solicitor at the Broadmeadows Legal Centre.

Political career
From 2008 to 2012, Spence served as a Councillor in the City of Hume, including as Mayor between 2011 and 2012. In 2013, she was selected as the Labor candidate for the seat of Yuroke and was elected to the Victorian Legislative Assembly at the 2014 Victorian state election. She later re-elected at the 2018 Victorian state election. 
Following the abolition of the Yuroke electorate, Spence won the seat of Kalkallo at the 2022 Victorian state election.

Following her election, Spence served as Government Whip and later as Parliamentary Secretary for Public Transport and Parliamentary Secretary for Road Infrastructure. She has also served as the Chair of the Electoral Matters Committee.

In March 2020, Spence was elevated to the Second Andrews Ministry following the resignation of Gavin Jennings as the Minister for Multicultural Affairs, Community Sport and Youth. She was additionally appointed as Minister for Prevention of Family Violence in June 2022.

Following the 2022 election, Spence was sworn in as Minister for Prevention of Family Violence, Community Sport and Suburban Development.

Personal life
Spence has one son and is married to former Victorian Labor assistant state secretary Kosmos Samaras.

References

External links
 Parliamentary voting record of Ros Spence at Victorian Parliament Tracker

1970 births
Living people
Australian Labor Party members of the Parliament of Victoria
Members of the Victorian Legislative Assembly
Victoria (Australia) local councillors
Mayors of places in Victoria (Australia)
21st-century Australian politicians
Women members of the Victorian Legislative Assembly
Women mayors of places in Victoria (Australia)
Women local councillors in Australia
People from Eltham, Victoria
21st-century Australian women politicians